John Cutte (fl. 1416) of Wells, Somerset, was an English politician.

Family
Cutte was married with two sons. Their names are unknown.

Career
He was a Member (MP) of the Parliament of England for Wells in October 1416.

References

Year of birth missing
15th-century deaths
English MPs October 1416
People from Wells, Somerset